Samshaya Phala is a 1971 Indian Kannada language romantic drama film written, produced and directed by A. M. Sameullah under the banner of Bawa Movies. It starred Udaya Kumar along with Srinath and Jayanthi in the lead roles. It had a very successful soundtrack composed by the veteran Hindi music composer Salil Chowdhary.

The film swept won award at the 1970-71 Karnataka State Film Awards for the best music direction.

Cast 

 Udaykumar 
 Jayanthi
 Srinath
 Pandari Bai
 Kanchana
 Sampath
 Jayaram
 Shivaram
 Jayashree
 Bheema Rao

Soundtrack 
The music of the film was composed by Salil Chowdhary, marking his entry in Kannada cinema for the first time and lyrics for the soundtrack written by Ku. Ra. Seetharama Sastry who was popularly known as "Kurasi". The cabaret dance song "Dooradinda Bandantha" featuring the vocals of L. R. Eswari was received exceptionally well and considered one of the best dance songs in Kannada cinema.

The hit song *Kuniyuta Janana Jana*  sung by great singer Smt. P.Susheela has been removed from d movie and the song is not found anywhere in Google or any other media. Why this happened, I don't know.

Awards
 Karnataka State Film Awards – 1970–71
 Karnataka State Film Award for Best Music Director – Salil Chowdhary

See also
 Kannada films of 1971

References

External links 

 Songs at Raaga

1971 films
1970s Kannada-language films
Indian black-and-white films
Indian drama films
Films scored by Salil Chowdhury